Sarah Elizabeth Beard (November 12, 1921 – January 11, 2012) was an American medical researcher, trained as a nurse. She retired in 1978 as a colonel in the United States Air Force.

Early life and education 
Sarah Elizabeth Beard was born in Truxton, New York, and attended high school in Homer, New York. She trained as a teacher in the state teacher's college in Albany, graduating in 1942, and then as a nurse at the Brigham Hospital School of Nursing in Boston, graduating in 1947. She later earned a master's degree in nursing service administration at Syracuse University in 1961.

Career 
Beard taught high school for two years in the 1940s, before training as a nurse. Her first nursing job was as a clinical instructor and nursing supervisor at Keuka College. She enlisted in the military in 1951, and worked as a Langley Air Force Base Hospital, as a flight nurse at Brookley Air Force Base, and as a flight nurse instructor at Gunter Annex. She gained administrative training at the medical field service school at Fort Sam Houston, and was assigned to the USAF hospital at Burderop Park in England.

Beard was promoted to the rank of captain in 1959. Beginning in 1961, Beard was a research scientist working on the problems of decompression sickness at the Air Force School of Aerospace Medicine, located at Brooks Air Force Base. Her paper "Comparison of Helium and Nitrogen in Production of Bends in Simulating Orbital Fights" was on the program at the Aerospace Medical Association meeting in 1966, and Major Beard was named Outstanding Nurse of the Year by the Texas Division of the Air Force Association that year. She co-authored several published scientific papers on the physiology of human bodies in orbit. Her work was consulted in planning for the Manned Orbiting Laboratory Program.

In 1969, she held the rank of lieutenant colonel, and was assigned to the Pentagon as special assistant. She was chair of the Aerospace Medical Association's Flight Nurse Section from 1968 to 1970. She was command nurse at Air Force System Command before she retired in 1978.

Her work was recognized with a United States Air Force Commendation Medal in 1968, a Joint Service Commendation Medal in 1972, and a Presidential Citation in 1982. She was named a Fellow of the Aerospace Medical Association in 1976.

Personal life 
Sarah Elizabeth Beard died in 2012, aged 90 years, in Baldwinsville, New York.

References

External links 

 NASA, Aerospace Medicine and Physiology: A Continuing Bibliography with Indexes (NASA 1966).
 Mary C. Smolenski, Donald G. Smith Jr., and James S. Nanney, A Fit, Fighting Force: The Air Force Nursing Services Chronology (Office of the Air Force Surgeon General 2005).

1921 births
2012 deaths
American nurses
Syracuse University alumni
People from Truxton, New York
American women nurses
University at Albany, SUNY alumni
Keuka College faculty
American women academics
21st-century American women